Kampl is a surname. Notable people with the surname include:

Kevin Kampl (born 1990), Slovenian footballer
Siegfried Kampl (born 1936), Austrian politician